

The Albatros J.II was a German single-engine, single-seat, biplane ground-attack aircraft of World War I.

Design and development
Albatros J.II was a development of the Albatros J.I with increased fuselage armour and a more powerful engine.  The J.II dispensed with the propeller spinner of the earlier aircraft.

Operators

Luftstreitkräfte

 Lithuanian Air Force - 3 units (production No. 705, 710, 714)

Specifications (J.II)

See also

References

Bibliography

 

Biplanes
Single-engined tractor aircraft
1910s German attack aircraft
J.II